Nahda, Hama  is a Syrian village located in Masyaf Nahiyah in Masyaf District, Hama.  According to the Syria Central Bureau of Statistics (CBS), Nahda, Hama had a population of 598 in the 2004 census.

References 

Populated places in Masyaf District